Temetiu is the South Marquesan name for the highest peak of the mountain ridge that rises above the western end of Ta'a Oa (the Bay of Traitors) in southwestern Hiva Oa.

Rising to 1,213 m (3,980 ft.) above sea level, Temetiu is also the highest point on the island.

Related links

Atuona
Marquesas Islands
French Polynesia

Landforms of the Marquesas Islands
Mountains of French Polynesia